The World Soundtrack Award for Soundtrack Composer of the Year (a.k.a. "Film Composer of the Year") is one of the three main prizes given by the World Soundtrack Academy to honour the best movie soundtracks and the people who work on them.

Winners and nominees
 2001 John Williams (A.I. Artificial Intelligence) 
 Rachel Portman (Chocolat, The Legend of Bagger Vance)
 Yann Tiersen (Le Fabuleux destin d'Amélie Poulain)
 Hans Zimmer (Hannibal, Pearl Harbor, The Pledge, An Everlasting Piece)
 Carter Burwell (A Knight's Tale, Book of Shadows: Blair Witch 2, Before Night Falls)
 2002 Patrick Doyle (Gosford Park)
 James Horner (A Beautiful Mind)
 Hans Zimmer (Black Hawk Down)
 Howard Shore (The Lord of the Rings: The Fellowship of the Ring)
 Randy Newman (Monsters, Inc.)
 2003  Elliot Goldenthal (Frida)
 Terence Blanchard (25th Hour)
 Elmer Bernstein (Far From Heaven)
 Howard Shore (Gangs of New York)
 Philip Glass (The Hours)
 2004 Gabriel Yared (Cold Mountain)
 Christian Henson (Les Fils du Vent)
 John Williams (Harry Potter and the Prisoner of Azkaban)
 Alberto Iglesias (La Mala educación) 
 Daniel Tarrab & Andrés Goldstein (La Puta y la Ballena)
 Harry Gregson-Williams (Shrek 2)
 2005 Angelo Badalamenti (Un long dimanche de fiançailles)
 Howard Shore (The Aviator)
 John Powell (The Bourne Supremacy)
 Thomas Newman (Lemony Snicket's A Series of Unfortunate Events)
 John Williams (War of the Worlds)
 2006 Alberto Iglesias (The Constant Gardener)
 Danny Elfman (Charlie and the Chocolate Factory)
 John Powell (Ice Age: The Meltdown)
 James Newton Howard (King Kong)
 Dario Marianelli (Pride & Prejudice)
 2007 Alexandre Desplat (The Queen, The Painted Veil)
 Harry Gregson-Williams (Déjà Vu, Shrek the Third, The Number 23, Flushed Away)
 John Powell (Happy Feet)
 Mychael Danna (Little Miss Sunshine, Breach, The Nativity Story, Fracture)
 Philip Glass (Notes on a Scandal)
 2008 James Newton Howard (Charlie Wilson's War, Michael Clayton, I Am Legend)
 Dario Marianelli (Atonement)
 John Powell (The Bourne Ultimatum)
 Alexandre Desplat (The Golden Compass)
 Alberto Iglesias (The Kite Runner)
 2009 Alexandre Desplat (The Curious Case of Benjamin Button, Coco avant Chanel, Largo Winch, Cheri)
 Carter Burwell (Burn After Reading, Twilight)
 Danny Elfman (Milk, Taking Woodstock, Notorious)
 Michael Giacchino (Star Trek, Up, Land of the Lost)
 Hans Zimmer (Frost/Nixon, Angels & Demons, The Dark Knight)
 2010 Alexandre Desplat (Fantastic Mr. Fox, The Twilight Saga: New Moon, Julie & Julia, The Ghost Writer)
 Hans Zimmer (Sherlock Holmes, It's Complicated)
 Danny Elfman (Alice in Wonderland, The Wolfman)
 John Powell (Green Zone, How to Train Your Dragon, Ice Age: Dawn of the Dinosaurs, Knight and Day)
 Carter Burwell (The Blind Side, A Serious Man, Where the Wild Things Are, Howl, The Kids Are All Right)
 2011 Alexandre Desplat (A Better Life, The Burma Conspiracy, The King's Speech, The Tree of Life, The Well Digger's Daughter, Harry Potter and the Deathly Hallows – Part 1, Harry Potter and the Deathly Hallows – Part 2)
 Clint Mansell (Black Swan, Faster, Last Night)
 Hans Zimmer (Inception, How Do You Know, Megamind, Pirates of the Caribbean: On Stranger Tides, The Dilemma, Rango, Kung Fu Panda 2)
 Patrick Doyle (La Ligne droite, Thor,  Jig)
 John Powell (Mars Needs Moms, Rio, Kung Fu Panda 2)
 2012 Alberto Iglesias (Tinker Tailor Soldier Spy, The Skin I Live In, The Monk)
Alexandre Desplat (A Better Life, Carnage, Rust and Bone, Extremely Loud & Incredibly Close, Moonrise Kingdom, The Ides of March)
 Cliff Martinez (Contagion, Drive)
 Howard Shore (A Dangerous Method, Cosmopolis, Hugo)
 John Williams (The Adventures of Tintin: The Secret of the Unicorn, War Horse)
 2013 Mychael Danna (Life of Pi)
 Alexandre Desplat (Argo, Reality, Renoir, Rise of the Guardians, Zero Dark Thirty)
 Danny Elfman (Epic, Frankenweenie, Hitchcock, Oz the Great and Powerful, Promised Land, Silver Linings Playbook)
 James Newton Howard (After Earth, The Bourne Legacy)
 Thomas Newman (Side Effects, Skyfall)
 2014 Alexandre Desplat (Godzilla, The Grand Budapest Hotel, Marius, The Monuments Men, Philomena, Venus in Fur, Zulu)
 Marco Beltrami (Carrie, A Good Day to Die Hard, The Homesman, Snowpiercer, Warm Bodies, World War Z, The Wolverine)
 Steven Price (Gravity, The World's End)
 Gabriel Yared (A Promise, In Secret, The Prophet, Tom at the Farm)
 Hans Zimmer (12 Years A Slave, The Lone Ranger, Man of Steel, Rush)
 2015 Michael Giacchino (Dawn of the Planet of the Apes, Inside Out, Jupiter Ascending, Jurassic World, Tomorrowland)
 Bruno Coulais (Song of the Sea, Gemma Bovery, Three Hearts, Mune: Guardian of the Moon, Diary of a Chambermaid, Fly Away Solo)
 Alexandre Desplat (Unbroken, The Imitation Game, Every Thing Will Be Fine, Tale of Tales)
 Jóhann Jóhannsson (The Theory of Everything, The 11th Hour, Sicario)
 Hans Zimmer (Interstellar, Chappie)
 2016 Carter Burwell (Anomalisa, Hail, Caesar!, Legend, The Family Fang, The Finest Hours, Carol)
 Ennio Morricone (Come What May, The Correspondence, The Hateful Eight)
 Thomas Newman (Bridge of Spies, Finding Dory, Spectre)
 Daniel Pemberton (From the Land of the Moon, Steve Jobs, The Man from U.N.C.L.E.)
 John Williams (Star Wars: The Force Awakens, The BFG)
 2017 Jóhann Jóhannsson (Arrival)
 Nicholas Britell (Moonlight)
 Justin Hurwitz (La La Land)
 Mica Levi (Jackie, Marjorie Prime)
 Dustin O’Halloran (Lion co-composed by Hauschka, Iris co-composed by Adam Wiltzie)
 2018 Jóhann Jóhannsson (Last and First Man, Mandy, Mary Magdalene, The Mercy)
 John Williams (Star Wars: The Last Jedi, The Post)
 Jonny Greenwood (Phantom Thread)
 Alexandre Desplat (Endangered Species, Isle of Dogs, Suburbicon, The Shape of Water, Valerian and the City of a Thousand Planets)
 Carter Burwell (Goodbye Christopher Robin, Three Billboards Outside Ebbing, Missouri)
 2019 Nicholas Britell (If Beale Street Could Talk, Vice)
 Daniel Pemberton (Yesterday, Spider-Man: Into the Spider-Verse, Scarborough)
 John Powell (How to Train Your Dragon: The Hidden World)
 Alan Silvestri (Avengers: Endgame, Welcome to Marwen)
 Benjamin Wallfisch (Hellboy, Shazam!, Serenity, King of Thieves, The Vanishing)
 2020 Hildur Guðnadóttir (Joker)
 Alexandre Desplat (Little Women, An Officer and a Spy, Adults in the Room)
 Thomas Newman (1917)
 Benjamin Wallfisch (It Chapter Two, The Invisible Man)
 John Williams (Star Wars: The Rise of Skywalker)

References

External links
 Official website
 World Soundtrack Awards at IMDb

World Soundtrack Awards